Raw Justice (also known as Good Cop, Bad Cop or Strip Girl) is a 1994 American action thriller film starring Stacy Keach, David Keith, Robert Hays and Pamela Anderson.

Plot 
New Orleans journalist Donna Stiles (April Bogenschutz) is in her home one night, preparing to take a shower, when a man sneaks into her home and kills her.

Donna's father, mayor David Stiles (Charles Napier), calls on Donna's former fiancee, cop-turned-bounty hunter Mace (David Keith), to stop chasing bail-jumpers and bring in the killer. Mitch McCallum (Robert Hays), who once dated Donna, with disastrous results, and is now accused of the murder, insists that he is innocent.

Mace has an uneasy relationship with the regular police force, especially Detective Atkins (Leo Rossi). Mace tackles his mission wholeheartedly until Mitch is nearly killed by a bomb planted in his home. Mace and Mitch are ambushed and pursued; they barely escape, accompanied by Sarah (Pamela Anderson), a hooker who witnessed the attacks and must go into hiding with Mace and Mitch.

Mace threatens Bernie (Bernard Hocke), a bail bondsman, with a baseball bat to find out who posted Mitch's bond and wanted him killed out on the street. After Mace leaves Bernie's office, Atkins uses the same bat to beat Bernie to death, setting Mace up to be blamed for Bernie's death.

Later, Mitch saves Mace from a gunman in his hotel room. Mace figures out that Mitch has been framed by Deputy Mayor Bob Jenkins (Stacy Keach), who had Donna killed so he could steal a disc from her computer, fill it with false accusations of incest, then use the disc to blackmail Mayor Stiles into refusing to run for office again, because Jenkins is tired of playing second fiddle to Mayor Stiles. Atkins has been working for Jenkins.

Jenkins admits to Mayor Stiles that Jenkins is the mastermind behind Donna's murder as Atkins pursues Mace, Mitch and Sarah across the bayou, finally cornering them in a clip joint, where Mace uses a giant dart to kill Atkins. Jenkins takes Stiles hostage and demands safe passage out of the city.

Jenkins shoots Mayor Stiles in the shoulder, and a helicopter arrives for Jenkins, who releases Mayor Stiles and gets on the helicopter. Disguising himself as Jenkins's pilot, Mace parachutes to safety just before the helicopter slams into a skyscraper, causing an explosion that kills Jenkins.

Primary cast
 David Keith as Mace
 Robert Hays as Mitch McCallum
 Pamela Anderson as Sarah
 Leo Rossi as Detective David Atkins
 Charles Napier as Mayor David Stiles
 Stacy Keach as Deputy Mayor Bob Jenkins
 Javi Mulero as Detective Gordo Garcia
 Bernard Hocke as Bernie
 April Bogenschutz as Donna Stiles
 Marshall Russell as Sonny
 Jeanette Kontomitras as Blaze
 Larry McKinley as Desk Sergeant
 Hal Jeansonne as Bartender Joe 
 David Veca as Thug #1

Production
Parts of the movie were filmed in Mobile, AL. Including the motorcycle chase between the Mace and McCallum characters through Springdale Mall (which has since been mostly demolished).

Pamela Anderson would later describe her simulated sex scenes as a "horrible experience". She later testified, "I was thrown around, I was scratched, I was bruised, I was bitten. I cried, I went home, I called my mother". Her experiences caused her to pull out of another film, "Hello, She Lied".

Critical attention
Raw Justice received the Bronze Award at the Worldfest-Charleston in the category for dramatic theatrical films.  It won under the title Good Cop, Bad Cop.

Glenn Kenny of Entertainment Weekly said: ''Raw Justice''', a mildly diverting item wherein Baywatch's Pamela Anderson throws caution and undergarments to the wind. Otherwise, this murder mystery is trash that knows its name, and goes about its exploitative work with breezy good humor.

The notable cast was the focus of other reviewers.  Many found it boring. Notable excerpts of the love scenes were made available online.

External links

Notes

1994 films
American action thriller films
Action International Pictures films
Films shot in Mobile, Alabama
1994 action thriller films
Films directed by David A. Prior
1990s English-language films
1990s American films